The Tamarac Wilderness is a  wilderness area in the U.S. state of Minnesota. Established by the United States Congress in 1976, Tamarac Wilderness is composed primarily of small lakes, wooded potholes, bogs and marshes.

Vegetation
Much of the wilderness is forested with white pine, maple, red oak, birch, and elm, with an under story of hazelbrush.  Portions of the area were logged in the early years of the twentieth century and contain second growth aspen.  On the lower, wetter sites of the wilderness, ash, balsam poplar, tamarack, and spruce are common.

Wildlife
A variety of wildlife can be found in the Tamarac Wilderness, including bald eagle, osprey, black bear, ruffed grouse, white-tailed deer, otter, porcupine, fox, beaver, coyote, and timber wolf, as well as numerous passerine birds. Fish found in Tamarac Lake include northern pike, walleye, largemouth bass, black crappie, bluegill, and yellow perch.

See also
 List of U.S. Wilderness Areas
 Wilderness Act

References

External links
 Tamarac Wilderness - Wilderness.net
 Tamarac Wilderness - GORP

Protected areas of Becker County, Minnesota
Wilderness areas of Minnesota